Rolf von Sydow (18 June 1924 – 16 June 2019) was a German film director and author.

Life 
Von Sydow worked as a film director in Germany. He married on three occasions. As an author, Sydow wrote several books and audible books.

Works by Sydow

As film director 
 1957: Mensch und Technik (short educational film about the Bundeswehr)
 1958: Der Alltag des Soldaten (short educational film about the Bundeswehr)
 1958: Der Sanitätsdienst in der Bundeswehr (educational film about the Bundeswehr)
 1960: 
 1962: 
 1969: 
 1983: 
 1989:  — (based on a novel by )

As television director 
 1960: Mein Freund Hazy
 1961: Das nasse Leben – Erinnerungen einer Brustschwimmerin
 1962: Typisch Lucy (TV series, 6 episodes)
 1962: Mit Musik kommt alles wieder
 1962: Warten auf Dodo — (based on a play by Eugène K. Ilyin and Gerard Willem Van Loon)
 1962: Drei Jungen und ein Mädchen — (based on a play by Roger Ferdinand)
 1963: Die Nacht der Schrecken — (based on a short story by Anton Chekhov)
 1963: Hasenklein kann nichts dafür — (based on a play by Hans Mahner-Mons)
 1963: Der eingebildete Doktor — (based on a play by Hans Weigel)
 1963: Der Liebesdienst — (based on the short story A Service of Love by O. Henry)
 1964: Amouren — (based on the play Present Laughter)
 1964: Frühling mit Verspätung — (based on the play And Suddenly It's Spring by Jack Popplewell)
 1964–1965: Die Gäste des Felix Hechinger (TV series, 8 episodes)
 1964–1965: Unsere große Schwester (TV series, 13 episodes)
 1964: Kennen Sie Heberlein?
 1965: Weekend in Paradise — (based on a play by Franz Arnold and Ernst Bach)
 1965: Schlußrunde — (remake of The Final Test, 1953)
 1965: Olivia — (based on the play Love In Idleness)
 1965: Man soll den Onkel nicht vergiften
 1966: Das Missgeschick, ein Lord zu sein — (based on the play The Chiltern Hundreds)
 1966: Wie wär's, Monsieur? — (based on the play Croque-monsieur by Marcel Mithois)
 1966: Träume in der Mausefalle — (based on the play The Keep by Gwyn Thomas)
 1966: Minister gesucht — (based on a play by Fritz Eckhardt)
 1966: Die Tage und Nächte der Beebee Fenstermaker — (based on the play The Days and Nights of BeeBee Fenstermaker)
 1966: Quadrille — (based on the play Quadrille)
 1966: Das Leben in meiner Hand — (based on the play The Life In My Hands by Peter Ustinov)
 1966: Der Floh im Ohr — (based on the play A Flea in Her Ear)
 1966: Das Experiment
 1967: Also gut! Lassen wir uns scheiden! — (based on the play Divorçons by Victorien Sardou and Émile de Najac)
 1967: Blut floss auf Blendings Castle — (based on a Blandings story by P. G. Wodehouse)
 1967: Mein Freund Harvey — (based on the play Harvey)
 1967: Unser Herr Diener — (based on the play The Admirable Crichton)
 1967: Ich will Mjussow sprechen — (based on a play by Valentin Kataev)
 1967: : Der Garten (TV series episode) — (based on a play by Tim Aspinall)
 1967: Auf Sieg? Auf Platz? – Auf Liebe! — (based on the musical Let It Ride)
 1967: Lord Arthur Saviles Verbrechen — (based on the short story Lord Arthur Savile's Crime)
 1968: Flachsmann the Educator — (based on a play by )
 1968: Heim und Herd — (based on Home and the Heart by Rosemary Anne Sisson)
 1968: Meinungsverschiedenheiten — (based on Difference of Opinion by Campbell Singer and George Ross)
 1968: Der deutsche Meister — (screenplay by Wolfgang Menge)
 1968: Schatzsucher unserer Tage (TV series, 13 episodes)
 1968: Der Idiot (TV miniseries, based on the novel The Idiot)
 1969: Ein Charleston für Lady Macbeth — (based on a play by Frédéric Valmain)
 1969: Bitte recht freundlich, es wird geschossen — (remake of Peter Yeldham's Watch the Birdies, 1966)
 1970: Bärenfang in Hinterwang
 1970:  (TV miniseries) — (remake of Francis Durbridge's Bat Out of Hell, 1966)
 1970: Das Mädchen meiner Träume — (based on Girl of My Dreams by Hugh Whitemore)
 1970: Der Minister und die Ente — (based on The Mallard Imaginaire by Alan Melville)
 1971: Eine unwürdige Existenz
 1971: Tatort:  (TV series episode) — (screenplay by Wolfgang Menge)
 1971: Letzte Mahnung — (based on Final Demand by Hugh Whitemore)
 1971: La Femme, le Mari et la Mort – Über die Schwierigkeiten, seinen Mann umzubringen — (based on the play  by André Roussin)
 1971:  (TV miniseries) — (remake of Francis Durbridge's Tim Frazer: The Mellin Forrest Mystery, 1961)
 1972–1973: Stadt ohne Sheriff (TV series, 26 episodes)
 1972: Monsieur Chasse – Wie man Hasen jagt — (based on the play  by Georges Feydeau)
 1973: Tapetenwechsel — (based on the play The Morning After by Peter Blackmore)
 1973: Tatort: Kressin und die zwei Damen aus Jade (TV series episode)
 1973: Tatort: Das fehlende Gewicht (TV series episode)
 1974: Tatort: Playback oder die Show geht weiter (TV series episode)
 1974: Du Land der Liebe
 1975: Das ohnmächtige Pferd — (based on the play Le Cheval évanoui by Françoise Sagan)
 1975: Tatort: Tod eines Einbrechers (TV series episode)
 1975: 6 Zimmer Sonnenseite — (based on the play 6 Rms Riv Vu)
 1977: Achsensprung
 1977: Teerosen
 1977: Des Doktors Dilemma — (based on the play The Doctor's Dilemma)
 1977:  — (remake of Francis Durbridge's A Game of Murder, 1966)
 1980: Leute wie du und ich (TV series, first episode)
 1980:  (anthology film)
 1980: Pygmalion — (based on the play Pygmalion)
 1980: Tatort: Tote reisen nicht umsonst (TV series episode)
 1980–1981: Liebe ist doof (TV series, 9 episodes) — (screenplay by Wolfgang Menge)
 1980: Weekend — (based on the play Hay Fever)
 1981:  — (based on Holiday Song by Paddy Chayefsky)
 1981: Der Schützling — (based on a play by Ephraim Kishon)
 1981: Ein sturer Bock
 1981: Keine Angst vor Verwandten!
 1982:  (co-director: Eugen York)
 1982: Wohl bekomm's — (based on the play À vos souhaits by )
 1982: Und das zum 80. Geburtstag — (based on a play by Lewis Grant Wallace)
 1982: Sonny Boys — (based on the play The Sunshine Boys)
 1982: Eine etwas sonderbare Dame — (based on the play The Curious Savage)
 1983: Roda Rodas rote Weste – Ein Leben in Anekdoten — (film about Alexander Roda Roda)
 1984: Beautiful Wilhelmine (TV miniseries) — (based on the novel Die schöne Wilhelmine)
 1984: Abgehört — (based on the play Overheard by Peter Ustinov)
 1985: Der Schiedsrichter — (screenplay by Günter Kunert)
 1985: Ich knüpfte manche zarte Bande (anthology film)
 1985: Glücklich geschieden (TV series, 6 episodes)
 1985: In Amt und Würden (anthology film)
 1985: Tatort: Tod macht erfinderisch (TV series episode)
 1986: Tatort: Die kleine Kanaille (TV series episode)
 1987: Laus im Pelz — (based on the play The Nerd)
 1987: 
 1987: Der Fälscher
 1988: In guten Händen
 1989: Zwei Münchner in Hamburg (TV series, 9 episodes)
 1990: Kann ich noch ein bißchen bleiben?
 1991: Altes Herz wird nochmal jung
 1992: Wiedersehen in Kanada
 1993: Weißblaue Geschichten (TV series, 2 episodes)
 1994: Ein unvergessliches Wochenende in Südfrankreich (TV series episode)
 1995: Rosamunde Pilcher: Karussell des Lebens — (based on Rosamunde Pilcher's novel The Carousel)
 1995:  — (based on Rosamunde Pilcher's novel Under Gemini)
 1995: Rosamunde Pilcher: Schlafender Tiger — (based on Rosamunde Pilcher's novel Sleeping Tiger)
 1995: Rosamunde Pilcher: Wolken am Horizont — (based on Rosamunde Pilcher's novel Voices in Summer)
 1996: Rosamunde Pilcher: Schneesturm im Frühling — (based on Rosamunde Pilcher's novel Snow in April)
 1997: Rosamunde Pilcher: Wind der Hoffnung — (based on Rosamunde Pilcher's story Toby)
 1997: Heiß und kalt (TV miniseries) — (based on a novel by Petra Hammesfahr)
 1997: Rosamunde Pilcher: Zwei Schwestern — (based on Rosamunde Pilcher's story Spanish Ladies)
 1998: Rosamunde Pilcher: Der Preis der Liebe — (based on Rosamunde Pilcher's story An Evening to Remember)
 1998: Männer sind was Wunderbares: Nicht ganz schwindelfrei (TV series episode)
 1999: Rosamunde Pilcher: Magie der Liebe — (based on Rosamunde Pilcher's story The House on the Hill)
 1999: Rosamunde Pilcher: Möwen im Wind — (based on Rosamunde Pilcher's story The White Birds)
 2000: Rosamunde Pilcher: Ruf der Vergangenheit — (based on Rosamunde Pilcher's story Gilbert)
 2001: Ein Stück vom Glück
 2002: The House of the Sisters — (based on a novel by Charlotte Link)
 2002: Die Kristallprinzessin
 2002: Rosamunde Pilcher: Morgen träumen wir gemeinsam — (based on Rosamunde Pilcher's story A Home for a Day II)

As actor 
 1980: The Green Bird (dir. István Szabó), as German Professor

as author 
books
 Angst zu atmen. Ullstein Verlag, 1983, .
 Der Regisseur. Ein autobiografisches Tagebuch. Rotation, Berlin 2011, .
 Rückkehr der Zugvögel. Ein schicksalhaftes Klassentreffen. Frieling, Berlin 2012, .
 Ich werde mich nie verlieren. Aufzeichnungen eines Kriegsgefangenen. Frieling, Berlin 2013, .

audible books
 Angst zu atmen. Gelesen von Rolf von Sydow. Dölling und Galitz, Hamburg 2004, .
 Rolf von Sydow erzählt aus seinem Leben: „Ich wollte von Hitler zum Ehrenarier ernannt werden.“ (Edition Zeugen einer Zeit). Paul Lazarus Stiftung, Wiesbaden 2011, .

External links 
 
 
 Rolf-von-Sydow-Archiv in archiv by Akademie der Künste, Berlin
 Tagesspiegel.de: Regisseur Rolf von Sydow gestorben (german)
 Focus.de: Kurz vor seinem 95. Geburtstag: Regisseur Rolf von Sydow ist tot, 
 Morgenpost.de: Rolf von Sydow im Alter von 94 Jahren gestorben (German)
 NZZ.ch: Der Film- und Theaterregisseur Rolf von Sydow ist tot, June 17, 2019

References 

1924 births
2019 deaths
People from Wiesbaden
Mass media people from Hesse
German male writers
Rundfunk Berlin-Brandenburg people